Watsontown River Bridge is a historic bridge in Watsontown, Northumberland County, Pennsylvania and White Deer Township, Union County, Pennsylvania. It is constructed of concrete and crosses the Susquehanna River.

It was listed on the National Register of Historic Places in 1988.

References

Bridges completed in 1927
Road bridges on the National Register of Historic Places in Pennsylvania
Bridges in Union County, Pennsylvania
Bridges in Northumberland County, Pennsylvania
National Register of Historic Places in Northumberland County, Pennsylvania
National Register of Historic Places in Union County, Pennsylvania
Concrete bridges in the United States
Open-spandrel deck arch bridges in the United States